Xinghua, the Mandarin Chinese pinyin transliteration of three similarly pronounced names (and ), may refer to:

Xinghua, Jiangsu, a county-level city in Jiangsu
Xinghua Prefecture, a historical prefecture in modern day Putian, Fujian
Xinghua Bay, the inlet beside Putian in Fujian, named for the former prefecture

Subdistricts
There are numerous subdistricts referred to as Xinghua Subdistrict, often with the identical Chinese name "":
Xinghua Subdistrict, Guangzhou, in Tianhe District, Guangzhou, Guangdong
Xinghua Subdistrict, Qitaihe, in Xinxing District, Qitaihe, Heilongjiang
Xinghua Subdistrict, Manzhouli, in Manzhouli, Hulunbuir, Inner Mongolia
Xinghua Subdistrict, Zhalantun, in Zhalantun, Hulunbuir, Inner Mongolia
Xinghua Subdistrict, Jilin City, in Changyi District, Jilin City, Jilin
Xinghua Subdistrict, Shenyang, in Tiexi District, Shenyang, Liaoning
Xinghua Subdistrict, Taiyuan, in Wanbailin District, Taiyuan, Shanxi
Xinghua Subdistrict, Daqing, in Longfeng District, Daqing, Heilongjiang
Xinghua Subdistrict, Jixi, in Chengzihe District, Jixi, Heilongjiang

Towns
There are numerous towns referred to as Xinghua, often with the identical Chinese name "":
Xinghua, Qinggang County, in Qinggang County, Heilongjiang
Xinghua, Henan, in Luoning County, Henan
Xinghua, Meihekou, in Meihekou, Jilin
Xinghua, Fengkai County, in Fengkai County, Guangdong

Townships
Xinghua Township, Liangdang County, in Liangdang County, Gansu
Xinghua Township, Tanchang County, in Tanchang County, Gansu
Xinghua Shui Ethnic Township, in Rongjiang County, Guizhou
Xinghua Township, Baiquan County, in Baiquan County, Heilongjiang
Xinghua Township, Huma County, in Huma County, Heilongjiang
Xinghua Township, Hubei, in Hong'an County, Hubei

See also
Xinghua Campaign of the Chinese Civil War
Xinghua Road (disambiguation)
Putian people, also known as Xinghua people
Xinhua (disambiguation)